Raw Thrills, Inc. is an arcade game entertainment company based in Skokie, Illinois. It is best known for developing arcade games based on films.

History
Raw Thrills was founded in 2001 by Eugene Jarvis, Deepak Deo, and Andrew Eloff. The staff also consists of other former Midway Games employees.

Early on, the company made games for IGT including Super Times Pay Poker, Multi-Play Blackjack, and Turbo Reelette with later games involving modifications of the Super Times Pay engine.

Raw Thrills' first independent coin-op game was Target: Terror, a light-gun shooter game which was later upgraded to Target: Terror Gold (also known as Target: Force) featuring bonus levels, end-of-round awards, and other performance enhancements. Target: Terror was the first gun game designed under the direction of Eugene Jarvis.

The company's second game was The Fast and the Furious, a racing game based on the Universal Studios movie of the same name. Tsunami Visual Technologies later made a motion version of the game for large family entertainment centers.

In 2006, Raw Thrills published two titles: Big Buck Hunter PRO, developed by Play Mechanix; and The Fast and the Furious: Super Bikes.  Raw Thrills released in 2007 a sequel to The Fast and the Furious titled The Fast and the Furious: Drift. They also released a continuation of the successful Big Buck series, Big Buck Safari in three different configurations which included a standard 27" cabinet, a 42" LCD version and an 8'x6' projected screen Theater version. They would also release a new update to Big Buck Hunter Pro with Big Buck Hunter Pro: Open Season in 2009.

After the success of their Fast and Furious DRIFT racing title, the company set their sights on kart-style racing with Nicktoons Nitro. The game featured licensed characters from various Nickelodeon Nicktoons including SpongeBob SquarePants, Timmy Turner from The Fairly OddParents, Aang from Avatar: The Last Airbender, Invader Zim, Jimmy Neutron, and Danny Phantom.

Also in 2009, Raw Thrills teamed up with Konami and Activision to produce Guitar Hero Arcade. Raw Thrills engineered the game while Konami and Activision were involved to cover patenting and licensing issues respectively. The game was a solid success selling over 2000 units in just three months.

In January 2009, it was revealed that Raw Thrills and Specular Interactive came together to produce a spiritual successor to the Midway arcade racer Hydro Thunder with a game entitled H2Overdrive. Specular Interactive was made up of several ex-Midway employees who had worked on Hydro Thunder and this led to H2Overdrive maintaining many of the ideas that Hydro Thunder had in place while adding in some new elements such as achievements, a leveling up system and improved physics. It also received high praise from critics. The original version of H2Overdrive came in a cabinet sporting a 42" LCD HD monitor and in March 2010 they produced a 32" version for smaller venues. A motion-based version was also produced in November 2009 that was being handled by Namco Bandai Games and UNIS. UNIS also holds the rights to distribute the game in China.

In March 2010, Raw Thrills and Play Mechanix released Terminator Salvation, a deluxe light-gun shooter based upon the film of the same name that was released to theaters in May 2009. The game received early praise from arcade operators as it exceeded earnings expectations during testing.

On June 16, 2021, Raw Thrills announced a port for its arcade game Cruis'n Blast, the latest instalment in the Cruis'n video game series for the Nintendo Switch system. It marks the company's first console game, and its first port to a home system as well as the first game since Target: Terror to be ported to a gaming console.

Games

Target: Terror (2004)
Target: Terror GOLD (2004)
The Fast and the Furious (2004)
Big Buck Hunter Pro (2006)
The Fast and the Furious: Super Bikes (2006)
The Fast and the Furious: Drift (2007)
Big Buck Safari (2008)
Nicktoons Nitro (2008)
Big Buck Hunter PRO: Open Season (2009)
Guitar Hero Arcade (2009)
H2Overdrive (2009)
Terminator Salvation (arcade game) (2010)
Wheel of Fortune (2010)
Super Bikes 2 (2010)
Fast & Furious: SuperCars (2010)
Frogger (2010) (Redemption Game)
Big Buck World (2010)
Dirty Drivin' (2011)
Big Buck HD (2012)

Cars (arcade game) (2012)
Doodle Jump Arcade (2012)
Winter X Games SnoCross (2012)
Batman (2013)
Pac-Man Chomp Mania (2013)
Aliens Armageddon (2014)
Barrel Of Monkeys (2014) (redemption game)
Super Alpine Racer (2014) 
Jurassic Park Arcade (2015)
MotoGP (2015)
World's Largest Pac-Man (2016)
Galaga Assault (2016)
Cruis'n Blast (2017)
Alien: Covenant (arcade game) (2017)
Space Invaders Frenzy (2017) (redemption game)
The Walking Dead (2017)
X Games Snowboarder (2017)
Injustice Arcade (2017) (developed by NetherRealm Studios and published by WB Games)
Teenage Mutant Ninja Turtles (2018)
Slither.io (2018)
Halo: Fireteam Raven (2018)
Super Bikes 3 (2019)
Nerf Arcade (2019)
Nitro Trucks (2020)
Fast & Furious Arcade (2022)

References

External links

Play Mechanix website
Specular Interactive website

American companies established in 2001
Video game companies established in 2001
Video game development companies
Video game companies of the United States
Companies based in Skokie, Illinois
Privately held companies based in Illinois
2001 establishments in Illinois